Sykkylven is a municipality in Møre og Romsdal county, Norway. It is part of the Sunnmøre region. The administrative centre is the village of Aure. Other villages in the municipality include Ikornnes, Straumgjerde, and Tusvik.

The  municipality is the 252nd largest by area out of the 356 municipalities in Norway. Sykkylven is the 135th most populous municipality in Norway with a population of 7,558.

General information

The municipality of Sykkylven was established on 1 August 1883 when it was separated from Ørskog Municipality. The initial population was 2,029. On 1 June 1955, the Søvik-Ramstad area of Ørskog Municipality (population: 348) on the southern side of the Storfjorden was transferred to Sykkylven Municipality.

Name
The municipality is named after the Sykkylvsfjorden. The first element is sík which means "small lake" or "inlet" (referring to the lake, originally probably an inlet of Fitjavatnet). The last element is also found in the names Sunnylven and Vanylven and the meaning is probably "fjord". The name was written Søkelven before 1889. From 1889 until 1917, it was spelled Søkkelven, and then since 1918 it has been written Sykkylven.

Coat of arms
The coat of arms was granted on 30 April 1984 by royal decree. The arms were designed by Kårstein Blindheim. The silver and blue figure represents the landscape of the Sykkylvsfjorden and is reminiscent of a large mountain silhouette from the municipality.

Churches
The Church of Norway has two parishes within the municipality of Sykkylven. It is part of the Austre Sunnmøre prosti (deanery) in the Diocese of Møre.

Geography

Sykkylven is a part of the Sunnmøre region and is surrounded by the beautiful alpine mountain range Sunnmørsalpene, including the mountain Råna. Most of the people in Sykkylven live along the Sykkylvsfjorden, which is a branch of the Storfjorden. The Sykkylven Bridge crosses the fjord connecting Aure to Ikornnes.

Sykkylven Municipality shares land borders with the municipalities of: Stordal to the east; Stranda to the southeast; Ørsta to the southwest. The Hjørundfjorden forms part of the western municipal border, and the Storfjorden forms the northern border. Across the Storfjorden lie the municipalities of Ålesund, Skodje and Ørskog.

Economy
Sykkylven is primarily an industrial community where furniture and furnishings manufacturing is the dominant industry (78% of manufacturing employment in 2004). Some of the largest factories in the industry are located here. Major companies in Sykkylven include Ekornes AS, Scandinor ANS, Hjellegjerde, Brunstad AS, Hjelle, and Cylindra. Drones are also manufactured. Agriculture is important along the fjord and in the valleys. The farms are small, with emphasis on livestock. There is also some fish farming at Hundeidvik and Søvik, along the Storfjorden. The newspaper Sykkylvsbladet is published in Sykkylven.

Ekornes is the largest employer (as of 2020); however, a new round of layoffs was announced in January 2023.

Government
All municipalities in Norway, including Sykkylven, are responsible for primary education (through 10th grade), outpatient health services, senior citizen services, unemployment and other social services, zoning, economic development, and municipal roads. The municipality is governed by a municipal council of elected representatives, which in turn elect a mayor.  The municipality falls under the Møre og Romsdal District Court and the Frostating Court of Appeal.

Municipal council
The municipal council of Sykkylven is made up of 29 representatives that are elected to four year terms. The party breakdown of the council is as follows:

Mayor
The mayors of Sykkylven (incomplete list):
2015–present: Odd Jostein Drotninghaug (Sp)
2011-2015: Petter Lyshol (H)
1999-2011: Jan Kåre Aurdal (KrF)

Notable people 
 Edvard Drabløs (1883 in Sykkylven – 1976) a Norwegian actor and theatre director 
 Jens E. Ekornes (1908 in Sykkylven – 1976) founded the furniture company, Ekornes AS, (Norwegian Wiki)
 Arnold Weiberg-Aurdal (1925–2016) agronomist, military officer and Mayor of Sykkylven, 1960's & 90's
 Jan Otto Myrseth (born 1957 in Sykkylven) a Norwegian prelate and Bishop of Tunsberg from 2018

Musicians 
 Kenneth Ekornes (born 1974 in Sykkylven) a jazz musician (percussion) and one of The Brazz Brothers
 Hilde Louise Asbjørnsen (born 1976 in Sykkylven) a jazz singer, songwriter, cabaret artist and songwriter

References

External links

Municipal fact sheet from Statistics Norway 

 
Municipalities of Møre og Romsdal
1883 establishments in Norway